Udûn may mean:

In Tolkien's Middle-earth writings 

 Udûn, Iron Mountains, also called Utumno, the underground fortress of Morgoth in the Age of the Lamps, before the First Age of Middle-earth
 Udûn, Mordor, the plain by the Black Gate at the northwestern point of Mordor in the Third Age

In motion pictures 

 Udûn, an episode in the streaming series The Lord of the Rings: The Rings of Power